In Austria, the standard time is Central European Time (CET; UTC+01:00). Daylight saving time is observed from the last Sunday in March (02:00 CET) to the last Sunday in October (03:00 CEST).

History 
The Austro-Hungarian Empire adopted CET on 1 October 1891. At first railways and post offices, cities such as Prague and Budapest, however not Vienna. Vienna eventually adopted CET on 1 April 1893.

Time notation

IANA time zone database 
In the IANA time zone database, Austria is given the zone Europe/Vienna.

See also 
Time in Europe
List of time zones by country
List of time zones by UTC offset

References

Notes

External links 
Current time in Austria at Time.is